Christian Leberecht Schnabel (13 May 1878 in Regensburg – 29 January 1936 in Munich) was a German designer and inventor.

Biography
Born as a son of a German smith and a Russian seamstress Schnabel was at times because of his original and innovative, but often as not very suitably for everyday life classified inventions, a well-known figure of the Bavarian public life. This made him, who received his education in his fathers smith near Regensburg,  an ideal victim of satire, from time to time Schnabel himself was asked to appear in smaller Cabaret-Shows and even a meeting with famous author Erich Kästner was reward for his dubious fame as a chronically fruitless inventor. Kästner was impressed by Schnabel and published after his death a poem about him in the book Dr. Erich Kästners lyrische Hausapotheke (1936). Later Schnabel was mentioned as one example for "the funny Germans" in an anthology. 
"The easy is the most difficult" is a famous word of Schnabel and it also became the  principle of his life: Schnabel mostly experimented on everyday objects trying to improve them. Especially his simplistic food cutleries, which reached from a mixture between fork and knife up to a fork with only one prong became virtually legendary. Earning laughs for such inventions in his lifetime, today there are in more extensive cutlery sets not seldom found parts which are not unlike the Schnabel-Inventions around the turn of the century. Nevertheless it seems to be possible, that Schnabel never wanted to invent useful objects and must be seen as a kind of early performance artist.

References

Literatur 
 Erfinder-Rundschau . München : Erfinder-Rundschau, 1913 -1914
 Rainer Thor : Humor ins Haus . Hamburg-Poppenbüttel : Humor ins Haus Bd. 340., Erfinder sind oft grosse Kinder, 1962

References

External link 
 Christian Leberecht Schnabel – Der chronisch erfolglose Erfinder? at www.regensburger-nachrichten.de

20th-century German inventors
German designers
1878 births
1936 deaths
People from Regensburg